Fairdale is an unincorporated community in Harrison County, Indiana, in the United States.

History
Fairdale was founded in 1867.

References

Unincorporated communities in Harrison County, Indiana
1867 establishments in Indiana
Unincorporated communities in Indiana
Populated places established in 1867